Massachusetts Senate's 1st Essex and Middlesex district in the United States is one of 40 legislative districts of the Massachusetts Senate. It covers 17.8% of Essex County and 2.5% of Middlesex County population. Republican Bruce Tarr of Gloucester has represented the district since 1995.

Towns represented
The district includes the following localities:
 Boxford
 Essex
 Georgetown
 Gloucester
 Groveland
 Hamilton
 Ipswich
 Manchester-by-the-Sea
 Middleton
 Newbury
 North Andover
 North Reading
 Rockport
 Rowley
 Wenham
 West Newbury
 Wilmington

The current district geographic boundary overlaps with those of the Massachusetts House of Representatives' 2nd Essex, 4th Essex, 5th Essex, 13th Essex, 14th Essex, 18th Essex, 19th Middlesex, 20th Middlesex, and 21st Middlesex districts.

List of senators

See also
 List of Massachusetts Senate elections
 List of Massachusetts General Courts
 List of former districts of the Massachusetts Senate
 Other Essex County districts of the Massachusett Senate: 1st, 2nd, 3rd; 2nd Essex and Middlesex
 Other Middlesex County districts of the Massachusett Senate:  1st, 2nd, 3rd, 4th, 5th; 2nd Essex and Middlesex; 1st Middlesex and Norfolk, 2nd Middlesex and Norfolk; Middlesex and Suffolk; Middlesex and Worcester; Norfolk, Bristol and Middlesex; 1st Suffolk and Middlesex; 2nd Suffolk and Middlesex
 Essex County districts of the Massachusetts House of Representatives: 1st, 2nd, 3rd, 4th, 5th, 6th, 7th, 8th, 9th, 10th, 11th, 12th, 13th, 14th, 15th, 16th, 17th, 18th
 Middlesex County districts of the Massachusetts House of Representatives: 1st, 2nd, 3rd, 4th, 5th, 6th, 7th, 8th, 9th, 10th, 11th, 12th, 13th, 14th, 15th, 16th, 17th, 18th, 19th, 20th, 21st, 22nd, 23rd, 24th, 25th, 26th, 27th, 28th, 29th, 30th, 31st, 32nd, 33rd, 34th, 35th, 36th, 37th

References

External links
 Ballotpedia
  (State Senate district information based on U.S. Census Bureau's American Community Survey).
 League of Women Voters Cape Ann
 League of Women Voters of Hamilton-Wenham

Senate 
Government of Essex County, Massachusetts
Government of Middlesex County, Massachusetts
Massachusetts Senate